Puto may refer to:

 Puto, a Spanish profanity
 Puto (film), a 1987 Filipino teen fantasy comedy 
 Puto (food), a Filipino food
 Puto (genus), a genus of scale insects
 Puto (song), by Mexican band Molotov
 Puto (TV series), a 2021 Filipino comedy

See also
 Mount Putuo, an island in China
 Putto, an artistic depiction of a boy